Phil Fearon and Galaxy is the eponymous debut album by Phil Fearon & Galaxy, released in 1984, by Ensign Records in the UK and Island Records in Europe and North America. The albums includes several successful singles, with "Dancing Tight", "What Do I Do?" and "Everybody's Laughing" charting in the top 10 of the UK Singles Chart. The album was also successful, peaking at number 8 on the Albums Chart.

Reception 
Reviewing the album for Record Mirror, Eleanor Levy gave it one out of five , writing "Without the slightest ruffling of the cerebral hemisphere, Phil Fearon's music goes in the right ear and out the left." "A couple of boppers, a couple of snifflers, all with irritating poppy drums and the requisite girly voices in the background. This is NICE music – innocuous and fluffy – couldn't hurt anybody. The problem is, it can't touch or move anybody either", concluding that it is "slick but boring".

Reviewing for Number One, Nick Adams gave the album three out five, writing "Now that Shalamar are gone, Phil plays the pop game better than any other black act. From video to chat show, Fearon has made sure his music has a name and a face. The result is the string of chart hits collected here into an amiable mixture of dance steps and smoochy ballads. It's classy, if undistinguished."

Retrospectively reviewing for AllMusic, Sharon Mawer gave the album three and a half stars out of five, writing "Five of the nine songs were released as singles with three of them going Top 10 in an era when it was the norm to release track after track to keep the album in the public eye, and although the album's chart run was short (only eight weeks) it made a suitable impression, carrying on from where Kid Creole & Coconuts and Modern Romance had left off with a series of bite sized funk-pop-dance songs, all sounding as if the band were having great fun, which they probably were." Mawer also wrote that "Fearon makes good use of his female backing vocalists Julie Gore and Dorothy Galdes who were not only given the harmony duties on most of the tracks but lead duties on most of the choruses."

Track listing 

A version with a different track running order (yet same catalogue number) was also released:

Personnel 
Galaxy
 Phil Fearon – lead vocals, backing vocals, electric piano, Grand Piano, Synthesizers, guitar, bass guitar, percussion, Drums
 Dorothy Galdez – vocals
 Julie Gore – vocals
 Lenny Fearon – vocals, trumpet, percussion
 Claudio Galdez – saxophone, flute

Additional musicians
 John Girvan, Bias Boshell – additional keyboards
 Pandit Dinesh, Floyd Dyce – percussion
 Frederick August, Simon Wagland, Piero Gasparini, Megan Pound – strings
 Basia Hook – guest vocals on "Do You Want More?"
 Kit Campbell, Jascha Tambimuttu, Helen Irwin, Terence Morris, Garry Hughes – additional musicians and singers

Technical
 Laurie Jago – engineer, production assistant, remixing
 Phil Fearon – engineer, remixing
 Joe Arlotta – New York remix engineer
 Nick Webb – cutting engineer at Abbey Road Studios, London
 John Morales and Sergio Munzibai – remixing at Blank Tape Studios, New York
 Alan Moy – mastering
 Mike Prior – photography
 Recorded at FJR Studios, London

Charts

References 

1984 debut albums
Island Records albums